Robert Colman  DD (or Coleman, died 1428) was an English medieval Franciscan friar and university Chancellor.

Colman received his Doctor of Divinity from Oxford University. He was at the Franciscan monastery in Norwich.  Among other works, he wrote Sermons, Sacred Lessons, and A Book of Sundry Poems. He was known for his "eloquence, erudition, wit, and judgment".

Colman was Chancellor of the University of Oxford in 1419. He resigned from the position in the same year and died in 1428.

References

Year of birth unknown
1428 deaths
English religious writers
English sermon writers
English Christian monks
Franciscan scholars
Chancellors of the University of Oxford
14th-century English people
15th-century English people
15th-century English writers
15th-century Roman Catholics